Patriarch Harootiun Vehabedian was elected Armenian Patriarch of Jerusalem in 1885, but he stayed in Istanbul until 1889, before arriving at Jerusalem to receive his post. Meanwhile, Yeremya Der Sahagian acted as locum tenens (caretaker). Patriarch Vehabedian continued serving until 1910. After him, the position of Armenian Patriarch of Jerusalem remained vacant from 1910 to 1921, when Patriarch Yeghishe Tourian was elected.

Armenian Patriarchs of Jerusalem
19th-century Oriental Orthodox bishops
20th-century Oriental Orthodox bishops